The 2018 WGC-Bridgestone Invitational was a professional golf tournament held August  on the South Course of Firestone Country Club in Akron, Ohio. It was the 20th WGC-Bridgestone Invitational tournament, and the third of the World Golf Championships events in 2018.

Venue

Course layout
The South Course was designed by Bert Way and redesigned by Robert Trent Jones in 1960.

Field
The field consisted of players drawn primarily from the Official World Golf Ranking and the winners of the worldwide tournaments with the strongest fields.

1. Playing members of the 2017 United States and International Presidents Cup teams.
Daniel Berger (2,3), Kevin Chappell (2,3), Jason Day (2,3,4), Rickie Fowler (2,3), Branden Grace (2,3,4), Emiliano Grillo, Charley Hoffman (2,3), Dustin Johnson (2,3,4), Kim Si-woo, Kevin Kisner (2,3), Brooks Koepka (2,3,4), Matt Kuchar (2,3), Anirban Lahiri, Marc Leishman (2,3,4), Hideki Matsuyama (2,3,4), Phil Mickelson (2,3,4), Louis Oosthuizen (2,3), Patrick Reed (2,3,4), Charl Schwartzel (2,3), Adam Scott, Jordan Spieth (2,3), Justin Thomas (2,3,4), Jhonattan Vegas

Adam Hadwin did not play.

2. The top 50 players from the Official World Golf Ranking as of July 23, 2018.
Kiradech Aphibarnrat (3), Rafa Cabrera-Bello (3), Patrick Cantlay (3,4), Paul Casey (3,4), Bryson DeChambeau (3,4), Tony Finau (3), Ross Fisher (3), Matt Fitzpatrick (3,4), Tommy Fleetwood (3,4), Sergio García (3,4), Brian Harman (3), Tyrrell Hatton (3,4), Zach Johnson, Satoshi Kodaira (3,4), Li Haotong (3,4), Luke List (3), Rory McIlroy (3,4), Francesco Molinari (3,4), Kevin Na (3,4), Alex Norén (3,4), Pat Perez (3,4), Ian Poulter (3,4), Jon Rahm (3,4), Xander Schauffele (3,4), Webb Simpson (3,4), Cameron Smith (3,5), Kyle Stanley (3), Henrik Stenson (3,4), Bubba Watson (3,4), Gary Woodland (3,4), Tiger Woods (3)

Justin Rose (3,4,5) did not play.

3. The top 50 players from the Official World Golf Ranking as of July 30, 2018.
An Byeong-hun

4. Tournament winners, whose victories are considered official, of tournaments from the Federation Tours since the prior season's Bridgestone Invitational with an Official World Golf Ranking Strength of Field Rating of 115 points or more.'Alexander Björk, Austin Cook, Paul Dunne, Patton Kizzire, Russell Knox, Andrew Landry, Thorbjørn Olesen, Wade Ormsby, Ted Potter Jr., Shubhankar Sharma, Brendan Steele, Brandon Stone, Aaron Wise

5. The winner of selected tournaments from each of the following tours
Asian Tour: Indonesian Masters (2017)  – Justin Rose, also qualified under categories 2, 3 and 4
PGA Tour of Australasia: Australian PGA Championship (2017) – Cameron Smith, also qualified under categories 2 and 3
Japan Golf Tour: Bridgestone Open (2017) – Ryuko Tokimatsu
Japan Golf Tour: Japan Golf Tour Championship (2018) – Kodai Ichihara
Sunshine Tour: Dimension Data Pro-Am – Jaco Ahlers

Nationalities in the field 

Past champions in the field

Round summaries
First roundThursday, August 2, 2018Ian Poulter shot an 8-under-par 62 to lead by one stroke over Rickie Fowler and Kyle Stanley. Defending champion Hideki Matsuyama was 5 strokes back at −3. Tiger Woods, eight-time winner of the event, was 4 strokes back at −4. His last PGA Tour win was at the 2013 event. The scoring average of 68.37 was the lowest opening round of a PGA Tour event this season.

Second roundFriday, August 3, 2018Third roundSaturday, August 4, 2018Final roundSunday, August 5, 2018ScorecardFinal roundCumulative tournament scores, relative to par''

References

External links

Coverage on European Tour's official site
Firestone Country Club site

WGC Invitational
WGC-Bridgestone Invitational
WGC-Bridgestone Invitational
WGC-Bridgestone Invitational
WGC-Bridgestone Invitational